Chen Kezheng is currently president of Qingdao University of Science and Technology, China.
He is a materials engineer.

Early life
Chen studied at Shandong University, China, and graduated with a master's degree in materials in 1989.
In 1997, he received his Ph.D. degree in materials engineering from Dalian University of Technology, China.

Career
From 2000 to 2005, he conducted postdoc work at the University of Florida, Department of Physics.
He then joined Qingdao University of Science and Technology (QUST), where he later became dean of 
School of Materials Engineering. In 2016, he was appointed deputy president of QUST.
In September 2019, he was appointed president of QUST.

Awards
He has received several national invention technology awards, along with Shandong provincial technology
awards.

References 

1965 births
Living people
Chinese academics
Shandong University alumni
Academic staff of Qingdao University
University of Florida alumni